Kotka is a town and municipality in Finland.

Kotka may also refer to:

People with the surname 
 Mimmi Kotka (born 1981), Swedish athlete
 Siret Kotka (born 1986), Estonian politician
 Taavi Kotka (born 1979), Estonian businessman

Places 
 Kotka, Harju County, a village in Kuusalu Parish, Harju County, Estonia
 Kotka, Võru County, a village in Haanja Parish, Võru County, Estonia
 Kotka Piran, a village in Khyber-Pakhtunkhwa, Pakistan

Other uses 
 2737 Kotka, a minor planet
 IKV-3 Kotka, a Finnish sailplane
 Kotka (crater), on Mars
 VL Kotka, a Finnish military aircraft

See also 
 

Finnish-language surnames
Surnames from nicknames